Nathalie Bourillon  (born 28 May 1965) is a French ski mountaineer.

Selected results 
 2001:
 4th, European Championship team race (together with Corinne Favre)
 2002:
 2nd, French Championship single
 3rd, World Championship team race (together with Véronique Lathuraz)
 8th, World Championship combination ranking
 2003:
 9th, European Championship single race
 2004
 2nd, World Championship relay race (together with Véronique Lathuraz and Delphine Oggeri)
 5th, World Championship team race (together with Véronique Lathuraz)
 5th, World Championship combination ranking
 6th, World Championship single race
 2005:
 1st, Tour du Rutor (together with Véronique Lathuraz)
 4th, European Championship relay race (together with Véronique Lathuraz and Valentine Fabre) 
 7th, European Championship vertical race
 8th, European Championship team race (together with Véronique Lathuraz)
 2006:
 3rd, World Championship relay race (together with Carole Toïgo, Véronique Lathuraz and Corinne Favre)
 5th, World Championship team race (together with Véronique Lathuraz)
 2007:
 2nd, Trofeo Mezzalama (together with Véronique Lathuraz and Corinne Favre)
 2008:
 3rd, World Championship relay race (together with Corinne Favre, Véronique Lathuraz and Valentine Fabre)
 4th, World Championship team race (together with Corinne Favre)
 5th, World Championship long distance race

Pierra Menta 

 1997: 4th, together with Corinne Favre
 2000: 3rd, together with Nathalie Blanc
 2002: 3rd, together with Véronique Lathuraz
 2005: 2nd, together with Véronique Lathuraz
 2007: 2nd, together with Corinne Favre

Patrouille des Glaciers 

 2006: 2nd, together with Véronique Lathuraz and Corinne Favre
 2008: 2nd, together with Laëtitia Roux and Corinne Favre

References

External links 
 Nathalie Bourillon at SkiMountaineering.org

1965 births
Living people
French female ski mountaineers
21st-century French women